Kuruthykkalam is a 1969 Indian Malayalam film, directed by A. K. Sahadevan. The film stars Sathyan, Madhu, Sheela and Shobha in the lead roles. The film had musical score by Jaya Vijaya.

Cast

Sathyan
Madhu
Sheela
Shobha
Abbas
Ambili
Bahadoor
Kottayam Chellappan
Nithya
K. S. Parvathy
S. P. Pillai

Soundtrack
The music was composed by Jaya Vijaya and the lyrics were written by P. Bhaskaran.

References

External links
 

1969 films
1960s Malayalam-language films
Films scored by Jaya Vijaya